Karl Arthur Olson (July 6, 1930 – December 25, 2010) of Kentfield, California, was a backup outfielder in Major League Baseball who played for the Boston Red Sox (1951, 1953–55), Washington Senators (1956–57) and Detroit Tigers (1957).
 
In all or parts of six MLB seasons, Olson was a .235 hitter with 160 hits, 25 doubles, six triples, six home runs and 50 RBI in 279 games played. Olson missed the 1952 season due to service in the Korean War.

Olson was an all-star player for Tamalpais High School in Mill Valley, California, where he graduated in 1948.  Boston signed him in June 1948, assigning him to the Triple-A Louisville Colonels in the American Association, which farmed him out to the California League team in San Jose, the San Jose Red Sox.

His minor league career ended with the 1957 season.

Sources
Karl Olson - Baseballbiography.com

References

External links

1930 births
2010 deaths
American military personnel of the Korean War
Baseball players from California
Birmingham Barons players
Boston Red Sox players
Charleston Senators players
Detroit Tigers players
Louisville Colonels (minor league) players
Major League Baseball outfielders
Major League Baseball center fielders
People from Ross, California
San Jose Red Sox players
Scranton Red Sox players
Tamalpais High School alumni
Washington Senators (1901–1960) players